The Roy G. Cullen Building (dedicated as Roy Gustav Cullen Memorial Building) is the oldest building on the present-day campus of the University of Houston.  It is believed to be the first building on a campus of higher education in the United States with air conditioning.  Construction for the building began in 1938, and was completed the following year.

History

From its inception in 1927, the University of Houston did not have a dedicated campus.  In 1936, when the university was still located at South Main Baptist Church, Houston philanthropists Julius Settegast and Ben Taub donated conjoining pieces of land totaling 110 acres (45 hectares) to the university.  This land was to be used as a permanent campus for the University of Houston.

Although land had been donated to the university, it was not until two years later that the university was able to build on the location.  Hugh Roy Cullen—a wealthy businessman—and his wife Lillie Cullen donated a combined $335,000 for the first permanent building to be built at the campus.  The building was named the "Roy Gustav Cullen Memorial Building" as a memorial to the Cullens' only son who had died in an oil field accident two years earlier.  H.R. Cullen would later serve as Chairman of the Board of Regents for the university—and before his death in 1957—had donated over $11 million to the University of Houston.

References

External links
Official building profile
University of Houston Buildings collection at the University of Houston Digital Library

University of Houston campus
History of Houston
University and college academic buildings in the United States
School buildings completed in 1939